The 2010 Glastonbury Festival of Contemporary Performing Arts took place in Pilton, Somerset, England in June 2010.

The festival was headlined by Gorillaz, Muse, and Stevie Wonder. U2 were initially announced as headliners, but withdrew on 25 May 2010 citing Bono's recent back surgery. Gorillaz were announced as the replacement.

The festival was totally rain-free for the first time since 2002, and experienced the hottest average temperatures since the early 1990s. The total attendance of the event was 177,500. This would also prove to be the last rain free Glastonbury Festival until 2019.

Tickets
Similar to previous years, ticket buyers were required to pre-register to buy tickets with photographic identification, a measure employed to avoid reselling and touting. Tickets went on sale on 4 October and sold out within 12 hours of going on sale; quicker than the past two festivals. The general resale commenced on 11 April at 9:00 am, with all tickets selling out within 2 hours.

Line up
On 23 November 2009, it was announced that U2 would be headlining the Friday evening of the festival.  Other acts confirmed by organisers include Jack Johnson, the early winners of the Emerging Talent Competition, My Luminaries and eventual final winners Ellen and the Escapades.

At the 2010 Event Production Show, Michael Eavis confirmed the booking of Muse and said that a headline appearance by Stevie Wonder was "probable", with the BBC confirming his appearance the following week.

On 14 April 2010, the full lineup of the event was announced.

On 25 May 2010, it was announced that U2 had cancelled their appearance at the festival to allow Bono's recovery from recent back surgery. Bono issued a special message of his heartbreak to the fans - "I'm heartbroken" - and said "we even wrote a song especially for the festival".
The following day it was announced that Gorillaz would fill in for U2.

Special guest appearances
A number of artists made special or unannounced appearances at the festival, including many on smaller stages such as the Park Stage or the Avalon Stage.

In early June, Keane announced a surprise slot at the Avalon stage.

Radiohead singer Thom Yorke and guitarist Jonny Greenwood, billed simply as "Special Guests", performed on the Park Stage on the Friday, introduced by Glastonbury founder Michael Eavis, who called them "two superstars" and "the biggest surprise of the weekend". They played Radiohead hits such as "Karma Police", "Street Spirit (Fade Out)" and "Pyramid Song" as well as some of Yorke's solo material.

The other secret gig on the Park Stage was by Scottish trio Biffy Clyro who announced on Twitter that they would perform at the Park Stage on Saturday. The trio had left a series of visual clues about their performance.

Kylie Minogue performed with the Scissor Sisters on the Pyramid Stage, and Lou Reed, Snoop Dogg, Mark E. Smith and Shaun Ryder joined the Gorillaz for various songs during their headlining set. Florence Welch, from Florence and the Machine, sang "You Got the Love" with The XX and "You Got the Dirtee Love" with Dizzee Rascal during his Pyramid Stage set. On the Pyramid Stage on Friday, during Snoop Dogg's set, Tinie Tempah came on stage and performed "Pass Out".

To make up for U2 cancelling their appearance, The Edge joined Muse during their Saturday headlining slot for a cover of "Where the Streets Have No Name".

Shakira invited to René from Calle 13 and them performed together their song "Gordita" at the Pyramid Stage on Saturday.

On the Sunday, Matt Smith, who plays the Eleventh Doctor, performed with Orbital and Michael Eavis appeared on the main stage with Stevie Wonder, to sing the chorus of the latter's "Happy Birthday", marking the festival's 40th year.

Stages 1 to 11
Source: Line up poster

Stages 12 to 20

References

External links

 Official website

2010 in British music
2010 in England
2010s in Somerset
2010
June 2010 events in the United Kingdom